Choreutis pariana, the apple-and-thorn skeletonizer or apple leaf skeletonizer, is a moth of the family Choreutidae. The moth was first described by the Swedish entomologist Carl Alexander Clerck in 1759. It is native to Eurasia and was introduced to New England, USA in 1917.

Physical characteristics
The wingspan is 11–15 mm.

Life cycle
The larvae feed, under a fine silken web on the upperside of a leaf, eating the parenchyma, except for the lower cuticle, which is left as a brown blotch resulting in a skeleton leaf appearance. Larvae are found on crab apple (Malus pumila), hawthorn (Crataegus species), paper birch (Betula papyrifera), willow (Salix species), cherry (Prunus species), whitebeam (Sorbus species), ash (Fraxinus species), rose (Rosa species) and alder (Alnus species).  Larvae have been recorded from June to early September in North America, while in Britain they are found in May and June and again in August. Larva pupate in a whitish, silk cocoon 15–20 mm long, usually on the underside of a leaf'.

In Canada, adults have been recorded from late July to late October. There are two generations per year in western Europe, with adults on wing in July and again in September, when it overwinters and may appear again in early spring.

Distribution
The apple leaf skeletonizer is found in Asia and Europe from Japan to Ireland and was introduced to New England in 1917. It is frequently collected in agricultural areas in North America where it is found along the west coast of the United States and British Columbia, Ontario, New Brunswick, Nova Scotia, Prince Edward Island and Newfoundland and Labrador.

References

External links
mothphotographersgroup
Bug Guide

Choreutis
Moths described in 1759
Moths of Asia
Moths of Europe
Moths of North America
Taxa named by Carl Alexander Clerck